"See Me Now" is a song by American rapper Kanye West featuring R&B singers Beyoncé and Charlie Wilson. The album version includes a verse by Big Sean and is included on West's fifth studio album My Beautiful Dark Twisted Fantasy (2010) as an iTunes Store bonus track. It was written by West, Knowles, Wilson and Sean, while production was handled by West, Lex Luger and No I.D.

"See Me Now" received generally positive reviews from music critics. The song peaked at number two on the US Billboard Bubbling Under R&B/Hip-Hop Singles chart in 2010 and appeared at number 160 on the 2011 year-end South Korean Gaon Chart.

Background and composition
"See Me Now" was produced by West, Lex Luger and No I.D. Southside was in the studio during Luger's production work on the song, which led to him being involved with West's 2011 Jay-Z collaboration "Illest Motherfucker Alive". It premiered on August 11, 2010. The song was also available on West's website, also on the same day, for a free digital download. The album version has an additional verse by Big Sean and is included on My Beautiful Dark Twisted Fantasy as an iTunes bonus track. Knowles recorded her vocals for the song at 5am.

During the bridge of the song, Knowles sings the lines, "I know one thing, my momma would be proud/And you see me looking up cause I know she's looking down right now". During the hook Wilson sings the lines "I know you see me now right now, I know you see me now right now" with a "deep" tenor.

In October 2010, the song "Never See Me Again" by West leaked. Described as a "a nine-minute melancholy demo song", it was supposedly recorded while West was in a self-imposed exile to Hawaii due to the backlash he received after interrupting Taylor Swift at the 2009 MTV Video Music Awards. Online speculation later formed the theory "Never See Me Again" was to be West's final song before retiring or committing suicide; West went public with suicidal ideation during this time. The song samples "Futari Dake no Ceremony" by Yukiko Okada; Okada committed suicide in 1986, with her suicide note ending with the phrase, "I want to see him again". Okada and Donny Hathaway's suicide by jumping from height has been interpreted as being influences on the lyrics on the original song and remix of "Power". "See Me Now" has been viewed as the triumphant, louder spiritual successor to "Never See Me Again".

Critical reception
 
Christian Hoard of the Rolling Stone gave the song a rating of three and a half out of five stars, writing in his review of the song: "'I'm Socrates, but my skin more chocolaty,' shouts Kanye, who goes on to detail several feats of attention-whore behavior — cruising in Ferraris, rocking fur coats, walking into high-end restaurants with no shoes on. But the sound is remarkably warm, a gospel-style mix of heartfelt crooning (from Beyoncé and... Charlie Wilson) and plush accompaniment that's perfect for worshipping at the altar of Yeezy."

Chart performance 
"See Me Now" debuted and peaked at number two on the US Billboard Bubbling Under R&B/Hip-Hop Singles chart on August 28, 2010. It appeared at number 160 on the year-end South Korean Gaon Chart for 2011.

Charts

Weekly charts

Year-end charts

References

External links
Kanye West' official website
Beyoncé Knowles' official website

2010 songs
Beyoncé songs
Big Sean songs
Charlie Wilson (singer) songs
Kanye West songs
Song recordings produced by Kanye West
Song recordings produced by Lex Luger (musician)
Songs written by Beyoncé
Songs written by Big Sean
Songs written by Kanye West
Songs written by No I.D.